Norman Gerard Ferguson (born October 16, 1945) is a Canadian former ice hockey player and coach. Ferguson was a forward who played either centre or right wing. He is the father of former NHL player Craig Ferguson. In 1982, Ferguson was inducted into the Nova Scotia Sports Hall of Fame.

Playing career
Ferguson played junior ice hockey with the Montreal Junior Canadiens for the 1964–65 and 1965–66 seasons. Ferguson moved to the Montreal Canadiens farm team, the Houston Apollos in the Central Professional Hockey League for the 1966–67 season. Ferguson then played for the Cleveland Barons in the American Hockey League in the 1967–68 season.

In his rookie season in the National Hockey League with the Oakland Seals, Ferguson set the Seals single-season record for goals; he scored 34 during the 1968–69 season. This was a new record for a rookie. After the season, Ferguson finished second to Danny Grant in the balloting for the Calder Memorial Trophy.

The New York Islanders selected Ferguson from the Seals in the 1972 NHL Expansion Draft, but Ferguson had signed a contract to play with the New York Raiders in the World Hockey Association for the 1972–73 season. Ferguson was the team captain of the 1974–75 San Diego Mariners. Ferguson finished his playing career with the Edmonton Oilers in 1977–78.

Coaching career
Ferguson took over as head coach of the WHL's Edmonton Oil Kings part way through the 1978-79 season. Ferguson later served as assistant coach for his hometown team, the Cape Breton Oilers of the American Hockey League for seven seasons from 1989 to 1996. Ferguson was assistant coach to George Burnett when the Oilers won the Calder Cup in the 1992–93 AHL season.

Career statistics

Regular season and playoffs

Coaching record

References

External links

1945 births
Living people
California Golden Seals players
Canadian ice hockey right wingers
Edmonton Oil Kings (WCHL) coaches
Edmonton Oilers (WHA) players
Houston Apollos players
Ice hockey people from Nova Scotia
Montreal Junior Canadiens players
Jersey Knights players
New York Golden Blades players
New York Raiders players
Oakland Seals players
San Diego Mariners players
People from Sydney, Nova Scotia
Nova Scotia Sport Hall of Fame inductees
Sportspeople from the Cape Breton Regional Municipality
Canadian ice hockey coaches